Kalimantsi is a village in Suvorovo Municipality, Varna Province, Bulgaria. Until 1934 the name of the village was Gevrekler.

Population 
As of December 2017, the village of Kalimantsi has 328 inhabitants. Nearly all of them are ethnic Bulgarians (96%) who belong to the Bulgarian Orthodox Church. The largest age bracket is the 60 to 69 years old group, with 73 people. Elderly constitute 33% of the population.

References

Villages in Varna Province